Hillar Palamets (13 July 1927 – 20 May 2022) was an Estonian historian and radio presenter.

Biography
Palamets was born in Tallinn on 13 July 1927. In 1951, he graduated from Tartu State University, specialising in Soviet Union history. From 1961 to 1996 he taught at Tartu University.

He was the author and host of the radio program Ajalootund. The program lasted 18 years (ending in 2012) and had 888 individual broadcasts.

Palamets died on 20 May 2022, aged 94.

Awards
 1964: Estonian SSR merited pedagogue

Works

 1977: Alma mater Tartuensis
 1982: Tartu ülikooli ajalugu. III (one of the authors)  
 1982: Alma mater Tartuensis (one of the authors)

References

1927 births
2022 deaths
20th-century Estonian historians
Academic staff of the University of Tartu
Estonian radio people
People from Tallinn
Writers from Tallinn